The 1984 New York Giants season was the franchise's 60th season in the National Football League (NFL). With a 9–7 record, the Giants finished in a tie for second in the National Football Conference East Division and qualified for the playoffs. In the Wild Card round, New York traveled to Anaheim Stadium and defeated the Los Angeles Rams 16–13 to advance to the Divisional round. Instead of traveling across the country back to New York, the Giants spent the week in Fresno, California. They used the facilities at Fresno State to prepare for the San Francisco 49ers. However, the Giants lost to the 49ers 21–10.

Offseason

NFL Draft

Personnel

Staff

Roster

Schedule

Game summaries

Week 1 vs. Eagles

Week 2

Week 3 (Sunday, September 16, 1984): at Washington Redskins

Week 6 (Monday, October 8, 1984): vs San Francisco 49ers 

Point spread: 49ers by 3
 Over/Under: 44.0 (under)
 Time of Game:

Week 9 (Sunday, October 28, 1984): vs Washington Redskins

Week 10 (Sunday, November 4, 1984): at Dallas Cowboys 

Point spread: 
 Over/Under: 
 Time of Game:

Week 13 vs. Kansas City
TV Network: NBC
Announcers: Don Criqui and Bob Trumpy
The Giants made a late comeback to defeat the Chiefs 28–27. Rob Carpenter helped their cause with two 1-yard touchdown runs. The Chiefs were leading 27–14 and were led by Bill Kenney, who threw three touchdown passes. The Giants then rallied; first came a five-play drive that ended with Phil Simms hitting Bobby Johnson with a 22-yard touchdown pass with 7:30 left. Then the Giants took the lead with an 80-yard drive that ended with a 3-yard touchdown pass to Zeke Mowatt with 2:22 left.

Playoffs

Game summaries

NFC Divisional Playoffs (Saturday, December 29, 1984): at San Francisco 49ers 

Point spread: 49ers by 12
 Over/Under: 41.0 (under)
 Time of Game:

Standings

See also
1984 NFL season

References

New York Giants seasons
New York Giants
New York Giants season
20th century in East Rutherford, New Jersey
Meadowlands Sports Complex